Johanna Maria Lehtinen (née Risku, born 21 February 1979 in Parkano) is a Finnish athlete who specialises in the middle distance events.

She competed at the 2005 World Championships in the 1500 metres.

Competition record

Personal bests

References
Johanna Lehtinen's profile in Tilastopaja

1979 births
Living people
People from Parkano
Finnish female middle-distance runners
Finnish female steeplechase runners
Universiade medalists in athletics (track and field)
Universiade silver medalists for Finland
Medalists at the 2003 Summer Universiade
Sportspeople from Pirkanmaa